NA-42 Tank is a constituency for the National Assembly of Pakistan. The constituency was created in 2018 by bifurcating NA-25 (Dera Ismail Khan-cum-Tank) where Tank district shared its representation with a portion of Dera Ismail Khan District. The current constituency completely comprises Tank District while the Dera Ismail Khan areas of the old constituency are now included in NA-39 (Dera Ismail Khan-II) .

Members of Parliament

2018-2022: NA-37 Tank

2018 general election 

General elections were held on 25 July 2018.

See also
NA-41 Lakki Marwat
NA-43 South Waziristan Upper-cum-South Waziristan Lower

References

External links 
 Election result's official website

37
37